Tripropylene, also known as propylene trimer, is usually sold as a mixture of structural isomers of nonene.  This mixture is obtained by oligomerization of propene:
C3H6  →   C9H18
In this process, two double bonds are lost and one is retained as illustrated by the isomer shown in the figure.  The reaction is catalyzed by acids, such as polyphosphoric acid. A variety of catalysts have been explored.  The reaction proceeds via the formation of a carbocation ((CH3)2CH+), which attacks another propylene unit, generating a new carbocation, etc.  This kind of process affords mixtures (C3H6)n.

Like other alkenes, propylene trimer is used as an alkylating agent.  A number of surfactants and lubricants are produced by alkylation of aromatic substrates.

See also
1-Nonene - the linear analogue

References 

Alkenes
Trimers (chemistry)